The 2011 Russian Artistic Gymnastics Championships will be held in Penza, Russia in February for WAG.

Medal winners 

Samara's Anna Dementyeva captured the women's all-around title Wednesday as the 2011 Russian Gymnastics Championships began Wednesday at Burtasy Sports Hall in Penza.

External links
 http://russiangymnastvideos.blogspot.com/2011/05/2011-russian-championships.html
 http://www.intlgymnast.com/index.php?option=com_content&view=article&id=2447:-grishina-grabs-russian-junior-championship&catid=5:competition-reports&Itemid=221
 http://paulziert.com/index.php?option=com_content&view=article&id=2451:sidorova-takes-three-titles-in-penza&catid=5:competition-reports&Itemid=221

References

2011 in gymnastics
Artistic Gymnastics Championships
Russian Artistic Gymnastics Championships
February 2011 sports events in Russia